Matvey Nikitin (born 2 July 1992) is a Kazakh cyclist, who most recently rode for UCI Continental team .

Major results

2013
 7th Road race, National Road Championships
2014
 8th Giro del Medio Brenta
2015
 2nd Minsk Cup
 3rd Overall Podlasie Tour
 5th Road race, National Road Championships
 5th Overall Okolo Slovenska
 5th Overall Black Sea Cycling Tour
 8th Overall Bałtyk–Karkonosze Tour
 9th Grand Prix Minsk
2016
 3rd Road race, National Road Championships
 3rd Overall North Cyprus Cycling Tour
 3rd Grand Prix of ISD
 7th Race Horizon Park Classic
2017
 5th Overall Tour of Mersin
 6th Coppa della Pace
 8th Overall Tour of China I
 9th Overall Gemenc Grand Prix
2018
 4th Road race, National Road Championships
2019
 1st Odessa Grand Prix
 3rd Tour de Ribas
 5th Horizon Park Race Classic
 7th Chabany Race
 9th Overall Tour of Peninsular
 10th Overall Tour of China II
2020
 4th Malaysian International Classic Race

References

External links

1992 births
Living people
Kazakhstani male cyclists
People from Oral, Kazakhstan
20th-century Kazakhstani people
21st-century Kazakhstani people